This is a list of 353 species in the genus Osmia, mason bees.

Osmia species

References